San Francisco Telixtlahuaca  is a town and municipality in Oaxaca in south-western Mexico. The municipality covers an area of 79.1 km². 
It is part of the Etla District in the Valles Centrales region.

As of 2005, the municipality had a total population of 10,278.

References

Municipalities of Oaxaca